Firth Shephard  (27 April 1891 – 3 January 1949) was a British writer,  theatre producer and presenter of plays.

Shepherd attended The Grocers’ Company’s School in  Downs Park Road, London,E.5.

The Shepherd Show was Firth Shepherds headline variety concert in the 1930s and 40s.

He was married to Constance Evans (died 1945).

References 

1891 births
1949 deaths
British theatre managers and producers